A15 or A-15 may refer to:
 A15 phases, a crystallographic structure type of certain intermetallic compounds
 A15 road, in several countries
 Antonov A-15, a Soviet glider
 British NVC community A15 (Elodea canadensis community), a British Isles plant community
 Chery A15, a 2003 Chinese 4-door car 
 Nissan A15, a straight-4 engine used in a range of cars by Nissan/Datsun
 ATC code A15 Appetite stimulants, a subgroup of the Anatomical Therapeutic Chemical Classification System
 Cortex A15, ARM Holdings' processor architecture
English Opening, Encyclopaedia of Chess Openings code
 A15 light bulb, a common household bulb
Apple A15 Bionic processor, designed by Apple and used in the iPad Mini (2021), iPhone SE (2022), iPhone 13, iPhone 13 Pro, and iPhone 14.

It may also refer to:
 A proposed attack version of Martin B-10 bomber
 Subfamily A15, a rhodopsin-like receptors subfamily